Keanon Lowe is an American athletics coach and former football player for the Oregon Ducks. He is known for preventing the suicide of a student by disarming the student and then hugging them, which was caught on security footage.

Early life and education 
Lowe grew up in Portland, Oregon in the suburb of Gresham. He was the second child of Jennifer Lowe and Kevin Lowe, who would move out when Lowe was nine, later divorcing. Lowe would teach his younger brother, Trey, things like riding a bike and sports, saying that he felt responsible for Trey as he remained by Jennifer's side during Trey's birth. Jennifer Lowe worked as an accountant to help pay for Lowe's tuition at Jesuit High School where he played football.

Football career 
In 2010, Lowe signed onto the Oregon Ducks as a student athlete. After playing wide receiver for the team, he tried out for the Arizona Cardinals, but did not get picked. He then went to work in Philadelphia as an analyst for the Philadelphia Eagles and later as an offensive analyst for the San Francisco 49ers.

Post-football career 
After about a year working as an assistant football coach at Jesuit High, he moved to Parkrose High School and became the head coach for both football and track and field. In January 2020, Lowe was named the head football coach at West Linn High School, taking over from Chris Miller. He later resigned in June to join Chip Kelly at UCLA, becoming a football offensive analyst for the UCLA Bruins. In February 2021, Lowe left UCLA to join Scott Frost at University of Nebraska–Lincoln, serving as an offense analyst for the Nebraska Cornhuskers. College GameDay aired a special about Lowe on their program.

2019 Parkrose High incident 
On May 17, 2019, 18-year-old student Angel Granados Dias entered Parkrose High School wearing a black trench coat and carrying a shotgun loaded with a single shell, intending to commit suicide in front of classmates. Lowe was sent to retrieve Dias to bring him to the counselor's office and was looking for him in the morning. After Dias walked into the same classroom that Lowe was in, Lowe grabbed the shotgun and gave it to a faculty member to keep it away from Dias, then embraced Dias. The incident was captured on security footage and Lowe was hailed as a hero for his actions in preventing a school shooting. Because of  his actions, he received the Congressional Medal of Honor Citizen Honor on March 31, 2020.

Movie 
On December 10, 2020, The Walt Disney Company announced that they were making a movie about Lowe produced by Seven Bucks Productions, currently known only as The Keanon Lowe project. As of September 2022, no release date has been announced.

Book 
Lowe is the author of Hometown Victory, published by Macmillan in 2022.

References 

Oregon Ducks football players
Jesuit High School (Beaverton, Oregon) alumni
University of Oregon alumni
Year of birth missing (living people)
Living people